Weinhandl is a surname. Notable people with the surname include:

Fabian Weinhandl (born 1987), Austrian ice hockey player
Mattias Weinhandl (born 1980), Swedish ice hockey player